First Methodist Church, Gatlinburg, also known as Gatlinburg First United Methodist Church, in Gatlinburg, Tennessee was designed by Charles I. Barber in Late Gothic Revival style.  It was built during 1945–1950, with first worship in 1947.  A second building, its education building, and a porch that joins them, was completed in 1961.  Both were designed by architectural firm Barber and McMurry. The building was listed on the U.S. National Register of Historic Places in 2007 for its architecture.

It is located on a hillside above the main area of Gatlinburg.  The original building is built of Crab Orchard stone from Bluff Mountain, used in foundation and exterior walls, Indiana limestone around the doors and windows, and Illinois slate shingles for the roofs.

References

External links
Gatlinburg First United Methodist Church, official site

Churches on the National Register of Historic Places in Tennessee
Gothic Revival church buildings in Tennessee
Churches completed in 1950
20th-century Methodist church buildings in the United States
Buildings and structures in Sevier County, Tennessee
Methodist churches in Tennessee
Gatlinburg, Tennessee
National Register of Historic Places in Sevier County, Tennessee